Thursby is a civil parish in the Borough of Allerdale in Cumbria, England.  It contains 23 listed buildings that are recorded in the National Heritage List for England.  All the listed buildings are designated at Grade II, the lowest of the three grades, which is applied to "buildings of national importance and special interest".  The parish contains the village of Thursby, and is otherwise almost completely rural.  The major building in the parish was Crofton Hall, but this was demolished in about 1958.  A number of buildings associated with the hall have survived and are listed.  Most of the other listed buildings are houses and associated structures, farmhouses and farm buildings.  The other listed buildings include milestones, a bridge, and a public house.


Buildings

References

Citations

Sources

Lists of listed buildings in Cumbria